Rosslyn Range (born November 29, 1933) is a male former long jumper from the United States, who competed in the 1950s. Range set his personal best in the men's long jump event (8.03 metres) on March 14, 1955, at the 1955 Pan American Games.

Achievements

References
Profile

1933 births
Living people
American male long jumpers
Pan American Games track and field athletes for the United States
Athletes (track and field) at the 1955 Pan American Games
Pan American Games gold medalists for the United States
Pan American Games medalists in athletics (track and field)
Medalists at the 1955 Pan American Games